→ or -> may refer to:

 one of the arrow symbols, characters of Unicode
 one of the arrow keys, on a keyboard
 →, >, representing the assignment operator in various programming languages
 ->, a Pointer operator in C and C++ where a->b is synonymous with (*a).b (except when either -> or * has been overridden in C++).
 →, goto in the APL programming language
 →, representing the direction of a chemical reaction in a chemical equation
 →, representing the set of all mathematical functions that map from one set to another in set theory
 →, representing a material implication in logic
 →, representing morphism in category theory
 →, representing a vector in physics and mathematics
 the relative direction of right or forward
 →, a notation of Conway chained arrow notation for very large integers
 "Due to" (and other meanings), in medical notation
 the button that starts playback of a recording on a media player

See also
 Arrow (disambiguation)
 ↑ (disambiguation)
 ↓ (disambiguation)
 ← (disambiguation)

"Harpoons":
↼
↽
↾
↿
⇀
⇁
⇂
⇃
⇋
⇌

Logic symbols